David Raul Miculescu (born 2 May 2001) is a Romanian professional footballer who plays as a forward or an attacking midfielder for Liga I club FCSB.

He started his senior career at UTA Arad in 2017, amassing over 110 games in all competitions before being signed by FCSB five years later.

Internationally, Miculescu has represented Romania at under-18, under-19, under-21 and under-23 levels.

Club career

Early career / UTA Arad
Miculescu joined the youth ranks of UTA Arad in the spring of 2016, after having previously played for Electrica Timișoara, the Gheorghe Hagi Academy and the Atlético Madrid academy in Bucharest, respectively. He made his senior debut for UTA on 23 September 2017, aged 16, coming on as a 78th-minute substitute for Amir Jorza in a 0–1 Liga II loss at Olimpia Satu Mare.

On 9 March 2019, Miculescu scored his first goal for the club by equalising in an eventual 2–1 home victory over ACS Poli Timișoara. In the 2019–20 season, he amassed three goals from 25 appearances as UTA became Liga II champion and achieved promotion to the top tier.

Miculescu recorded his first match in the Liga I on 28 September 2020, in a 1–0 away defeat of Dinamo București, and netted for the first time on 20 April 2021 in another 1–0 win against the same opponent. On 2 October 2021, he scored his first career double in a 2–2 league draw also against Dinamo București.

On 22 April 2022, Miculescu signed a contract extension that would have kept him at the club until 2024. On 25 July, he scored his first goals of the campaign in a 2–0 home win over newly-promoted Petrolul Ploiești.

FCSB
On 1 August 2022, Miculescu was officially unveiled at FCSB after the club activated his €1.7 million release clause. He signed a five-year contract and was handed the number 11 shirt.

Two days later, he registered his debut by starting in a 1–0 away win over DAC Dunajská Streda in the UEFA Europa Conference League third qualifying round. On his Liga I debut against Mioveni on 6 August, he scored a header to seal a 1–1 draw.

Style of play
A tall and physical player, Miculescu can be deployed in an advanced midfield position or wide as a winger, preferably on the right flank.

Personal life
Miculescu's father, Valentin, was also a professional footballer. A striker, he too played for UTA Arad.

Career statistics

Club

Honours
UTA Arad
Liga II: 2019–20

References

External links
 
 

2001 births
Living people
Sportspeople from Arad, Romania
Sportspeople from Timișoara
Romanian footballers
Association football forwards
Liga I players
Liga II players
FC UTA Arad players
FC Steaua București players
Romania youth international footballers
Romania under-21 international footballers
Olympic footballers of Romania